The Janambre (Xanambre) were an indigenous people of Tamaulipas in northeast Mexico. They were the historical enemies of the Pison (Pisones).

Language
The Janambre language, now extinct, is unattested. William Bright (1955) thought the Janambre language might have been Naolan, an unclassified language of the region. 
Other unattested extinct languages of Tamaulipas include Pisone, "Negrito" and Olive.

See also
Naolan language
Tamaulipeco language
Maratino language
Quinigua language
Coahuiltecan languages

References

Unattested languages of North America
Indigenous languages of Mexico
Extinct languages of North America
Indigenous peoples of Aridoamerica
History of Tamaulipas